Nicolas Kelaidis (born 29 October 1949) is a Greek former professional tennis player.

Biography
Kelaidis was born in the Egyptian city of Alexandria, which had a large Greek population at the time. He played college tennis in the United States, at Clemson University from 1968 to 1971.

During the 1970s, Kelaidis competed on the professional tennis circuit and was a regular member of the Greece Davis Cup team, featuring in a total of 10 ties. He appeared in the main draws of the Australian Open, French Open and Wimbledon.

For most of the 1980s he was a coach for the Swiss Tennis Federation, then spent a decade coaching for the French Federation, with his roles at both focusing on women's tennis. He married Swiss tennis player Lilian Drescher.

References

External links
 
 
 

1949 births
Living people
Greek male tennis players
Tennis coaches
Clemson Tigers men's tennis players
Egyptian emigrants to Greece
Sportspeople from Alexandria